Oppurg is a municipality in the district of Saale-Orla-Kreis, in Thuringia, Germany.

The main attraction is Schloss Oppurg, a 18th century mansion which once belonged to Hoym and Hohenlohe families. The princes of Hohenlohe-Oehringen owned the castle up to 1945. Today, it is a hotel.

References

Saale-Orla-Kreis